Heinrich Lossow (10 March 1843 in Munich, Kingdom of Bavaria – 19 May 1897 in Schleissheim, Austria-Hungary) was a German genre painter and illustrator. He was a prolific pornographer in his spare time.

Biography
Heinrich Lossow's father was Arnold Hermann Lossow, a Bremen sculptor. His father moved to Munich in 1820 to study under Ernst Mayer. In Munich, Arnold Hermann Lossow married and had three children: Carl Lossow in 1835, Friedrich Lossow in 1837, and Heinrich Lossow in 1843. The three boys had an affinity for art; Carl became a historical painter, while Friedrich became a wildlife painter. Heinrich would outlive both his siblings.

He first trained under his father but would go on to study under Karl Theodor von Piloty at the Munich Academy of Fine Arts. He then traveled through France and Italy perfecting his art.

His was an illustrator for publishers, including one for an edition of William Shakespeare's The Merry Wives of Windsor.

Later in his life, he served as a curator at the Schleissheim Palace.

Gallery

References

1843 births
1897 deaths
German male painters
German pornographers
German erotic artists
German illustrators
Artists from Munich
19th-century German painters
19th-century German male artists